Government Model Senior Secondary School can refer to:

 Government Model Senior Secondary School, Sector-16, Chandigarh
 Government Model Senior Secondary School Dhundan
 Government Model Senior Secondary School Junga
 Government model secondary school, Khulna